"Shriman Gambhir", formally known as "Rastriya Gaan" (literally meaning "national song") was the national anthem of the Kingdom of Nepal from 1962 to 19 May 2006, when the political parties prepared to abolish the monarchy. In English, it may be glossed as "May Glory Crown You, Courageous Sovereign" or "May Glory Crown Our Illustrious Sovereign".

History

The music was composed by Bakhat Bahadur Budhapirthi (grandfather of musician Louis Banks) in 1899, and the lyrics were written by Chakrapani Chalise in 1924. It was adopted as the country's national anthem in 1962, as a homage to the Nepalese sovereign.

The song originally had two stanzas, but the Nepalese government dropped the second stanza upon adopting the song as the national anthem. The stanza that was retained honoured the king.

Replacement

Following the 2006 democracy movement in Nepal, "Rastriya Gaan" was discontinued by order of the interim legislature of Nepal in August 2007, after it was seen as merely glorifying the monarchy instead of representing the nation as a whole. It was then replaced by the current national anthem, "Sayaun Thunga Phulka".

Full Version (with second verse)

The second verse of the song largely remained unknown to most people. On 10 January 2019, a YouTube channel, Classic Reignite, released a re-recorded and rendered version of the anthem with its second verse. The first four-bar of the song features a regal orchestral introduction which is soon followed by a choir singing. It was dropped in the version which became the national anthem.

Lyrics

Official lyrics

Second verse
When officially adopted, the government of Nepal dropped the second verse of the song.

References

Historical national anthems
Nepalese songs
Royal anthems
Asian anthems
Nepalese monarchy
Kingdom of Nepal
1962 establishments in Nepal
2006 disestablishments in Nepal
Nepali-language songs